Saša Ranić (born 7 November 1981) is a retired Slovenian football midfielder.

References

External links
NZS profile 

1981 births
Living people
People from Šempeter pri Gorici
Slovenian footballers
Association football midfielders
NK Primorje players
ND Gorica players
NK Olimpija Ljubljana (2005) players
NK Krka players
Slovenian PrvaLiga players
Swiss Challenge League players
Super League Greece players
Football League (Greece) players
Slovenian expatriate footballers
Slovenian expatriate sportspeople in Switzerland
Expatriate footballers in Switzerland
Slovenian expatriate sportspeople in Greece
Expatriate footballers in Greece
Slovenian expatriate sportspeople in Italy
Expatriate footballers in Italy
Veria F.C. players
A.O. Kerkyra players
Panserraikos F.C. players